Clearwater Valley High School is a high school located in Kooskia, Idaho. It belongs to Mountain View School District 244. The school mascot is the Ram.

Demographics

 Male Population: 99
 Female Population: 112
 Pupil / Teacher Ratio : 12.5

Activities
There are many activities that are offered at Clearwater Valley.
Sports include volleyball, football, boys and girls basketball, cross-country, wrestling, baseball, track and tennis.
As for special clubs there is drama, FFA (Future Farmers of America), academic bowl, concert and pep band, and BPA (Business Professionals of America). During homecoming there are three special events that take place: Volley Puff which is where the boys play volleyball, Powder Puff where the girls play football, and the class competitions.

Special events
Special Events that occur during the school year is the Yearbook Signing Party, Veterans Day Assembly, Sadie Hawkins Dance, Food Drive, Christmas Show, Alumni Games, Shakespeare's Birthday, Mother/Daughter Tea, Prom, Junior/Senior BBQ, CVHS Olympics, Graduation, and Class Night.

References

Public high schools in Idaho
Schools in Idaho County, Idaho